Goodenia trichophylla is a species of flowering plant in the family Goodeniaceae and is endemic to the southwest of Western Australia. It is an erect to ascending herb with sticky or shiny, linear leaves at the base of the plant and racemes of blue flowers.

Description

Taxonomy and naming
Goodenia trichophylla was first formally described in 1886 by George Bentham in Flora Australiensis from an unpublished description by Willem Hendrik de Vriese. The specific epithet (trichophylla) means "hair-leaved".

Distribution and habitat
This goodenia grows in sandy soil in the south-west of Western Australia.

Conservation status
Goodenia trichophylla is classified as "not threatened" by the Department of Biodiversity, Conservation and Attractions.

References

trichophylla
Endemic flora of Western Australia
Plants described in 1868
Taxa named by George Bentham